Laye may refer to:

People
 Camara Laye (1928–1980), Guinean writer
 Dilys Laye (1934–2009), English actress and screenwriter
 Evelyn Laye (1900–1996), English actress
 Issa Laye Thiaw (1943–2017), Senegalese historian, theologian, and author
 Joseph Henry Laye (1849–1938), British army officer
 Seydina Mouhammadou Limamou Laye (1843–1909), Senegalese religious leader

Places
 Laye, Burkina Faso (fr)
 Laye, Hautes-Alpes, France
 Laye Department, Burkina Faso